Ricky Eat Acid is the solo project of American musician Sam Ray.

History 
Sam Ray (born April 25, 1991) began the project Ricky Eat Acid in 2010 with the self-release of an EP titled Sometimes We're Blue. A year later he released an album titled Haunt U Forever via Chill Mega Chill.

In January 2012, Ray released a song titled "A Smoothie Robot For Moon Mansion" via Bad Panda Records. In December of the same year, Ray released an album titled You Get Sick; You Regret Things via Orchid Tapes.

In January 2014, Ray released his third full-length album (second with Orchid Tapes) titled Three Love Songs. On July 8, 2014, Ray self-released an EP titled Sun Over Hills. On July 15, 2014, Ray released a single titled "Pull (May15)" via Secret Songs.

In January 2015, Ray released a song titled "Context" via Canvasclub. In May 2015, Ray released a mixtape titled Mixtape.

On May 25, 2016, Ray married electronic artist Kitty in DeLand, Florida. On September 8, 2016, Ray debuted the first song titled "Hey" off of his latest album titled Talk To You Soon, which was released on October 28, 2016, via Terrible Records.

Discography

Albums 
Seeing Little Ghosts Everywhere (2011, self-released)
Haunt U Forever (2011, Chill Mega Chill)
You Get Sick; You Regret Things (2012, Orchid Tapes)
Three Love Songs (2014, Orchid Tapes)
Talk to You Soon (2016, Terrible Records)
Am I Happy, Singing (2018, self-released)
When They Align Just So, Memories of Another Life Bleed into My Own (2020)

EPs 
Sometimes We're Blue (2010, self-released)
Sun Over Hills (2014, self-released)

Mixtapes 
Mixtape (2015, self-released)

Singles 
"A Smoothie Robot for My Moon Mansion" (2012, Bad Panda)
"Pull (May15)" (2014, Secret Songs)
"Context" (2015, Canvasclub)

See also
Julia Brown (band)
Teen Suicide (band)

References 

Musicians from Maryland
1991 births
Living people
Musicians from Baltimore
21st-century American musicians